The alveolar ejective fricative is a type of consonantal sound, used in some spoken languages.

Features
Features of the alveolar ejective fricative:

Occurrence

See also
 List of phonetic topics

References

External links
 

Alveolar consonants
Fricative consonants
Ejectives
Oral consonants
Central consonants